Now That's What I Call Music! 19 may refer to  two different "Now That's What I Call Music!" series albums, including
 Now! That's What I Call Music 19 (original UK series, 1991 release)
 Now That's What I Call Music! 19 (U.S. series, 2005 release)